2006 French Syndicate of Cinema Critics Awards
January 30, 2006

Best Picture:
 The Beat That My Heart Skipped
The 2006 French Syndicate of Cinema Critics Awards, given on 30 January 2006, honored the best in film for 2005.

Winners 
Best Film: De battre mon coeur s'est arrêté (The Beat That My Heart Skipped)
Best Short: Stricteternum
Best Foreign Film: A History of Violence
Best First Film: La petite Jérusalem

External links 
2006 French Syndicate of Cinema Critics Awards at the IMDB

2006 film awards
French Union of Film Critics Awards
2006 in French cinema
January 2006 events in France